Lac de Matemale is an artificial lake in the commune of Matemale in the Pyrénées-Orientales, France. At an elevation of 1541 m, its surface area is 2.23 km2.

Matemale